Henry William Piro (December 20, 1917 – April 18, 2011) was a professional American football end who played in 1941 with the Philadelphia Eagles.

External links
Pro-Football-Reference

1917 births
2011 deaths
American football ends
Philadelphia Eagles players
Syracuse Orange football players
German emigrants to the United States